Climate Change – The Facts is a 2019 British documentary presented by David Attenborough that discusses climate change and possible solutions to counteract it. The one-hour programme made its debut on BBC One in the United Kingdom at 9pm on 18 April 2019.

Reception 
The film won general praise from critics for highlighting the dangers that could be presented by not doing enough to tackle climate change. The Guardian called it a "rousing call to arms", while The Telegraph described the title as "robust" and praised the use of Attenborough as presenter: "At a time when public debate seems to be getting ever more hysterical, it's good to be presented with something you can trust. And we all trust Attenborough."

References

External links
 
 

2019 in British television
2019 television films
2019 films
BBC television documentaries
Documentary films about global warming
British television documentaries
David Attenborough
Documentary films about nature
English-language television shows
2019 documentary films
2010s British films